Culladia troglodytellus is a moth in the family Crambidae. It was described by Snellen in 1872. It is found in the Democratic Republic of Congo, Gabon, Ivory Coast, La Réunion, Mauritius and Nigeria.

References

Crambini
Moths described in 1872
Moths of Africa